Rabindra Jayanti (রবীন্দ্র জয়ন্তী) is an annually celebrated cultural festival, prevalent among Tagorephiles (people who love Tagore and his works) around the world, in the remembrance of Rabindranath Tagore's birthday anniversary. It is celebrated in early May, on the 25th day of the Bengali month of Boishakh (২৫শে বৈশাখ), since Tagore was born on this day of the year 1268 (1861 AD) (২৫শে বৈশাখ, ১২৬৮) of the Bengali calendar. Every year, numerous cultural programmes & events, such as : Kabipranam (কবিপ্রণাম) –  the songs (Rabindra Sangeet), poetries, dances and dramas, written and composed by Tagore, are organised in this particular day, by various schools, colleges & universities of Bengal, and also celebrated by different groups abroad, as a tribute to Tagore and his works. Throughout the globe, Tagore's birth anniversary is largely celebrated at Santiniketan, Birbhum in West Bengal, chiefly in Visva-Bharati University, the institution founded by Tagore himself for the cultural, social and educational upliftment of the students as well as the society. Government of India Issued 5 Rupees coin in 2011 to mark the 150 Birth Anniversary in the honor of Rabindranath Tagore.

See also
 List of festivals in West Bengal
 List of festivals in Bangladesh

References

External links

Rabindranath Tagore